Bagryanov is a Slavic masculine surname, its feminine counterpart is Bagryanova. Notable people with the surname include:

 Ivan Ivanov Bagryanov (1891–1945), Prime Minister of Bulgaria
 Dmitry Bagryanov (born 1967), Russian long jumper

Russian-language surnames